Carlens is born a given name and a surname. Notable people with the name include:

Carlens Arcus (born 1996), Haitian association football player
Stef Kamil Carlens (born 1970), Belgian singer-songwriter, musician, composer, and record producer

See also

Carlen (surname)